Ward 3 Etobicoke—Lakeshore is a municipal electoral division in Etobicoke, Toronto, Ontario that has been represented in the Toronto City Council since the 2018 municipal election. It was last contested in 2022, with Amber Morley elected councillor.

History 
The ward was created in 2018 when the provincial government aligned Toronto's then-44 municipal wards with the 25 corresponding provincial and federal ridings. The current ward is an amalgamation of the old Ward 5 (northern section), the old Ward 6 (southern section).

2022 municipal election 
Amber Morley was elected to represent Ward 3 in the 2022 municipal election. She defeated Mark Grimes, the only defeat of an incumbent councillor who was running for reelection in 2022.

2018 municipal election 
Ward 3 was first contested during the 2018 municipal election. Then-Ward 6 incumbent Mark Grimes was elected with 40.9 per cent of the vote.

Geography 
Etobicoke—Lakeshore is part of the Etobicoke and York community council. 

The ward occupies the southwestern part of Toronto. It is roughly bordered on the west by the Etobicoke Creek, and on the east by the Humber River. On the north, Ward 3 is roughly bordered by Bloor Street, Kipling Avenue, the Mimico Creek and Dundas Street, and on the south by Lake Ontario.

Councillors

Election results

See also 

 Municipal elections in Canada
 Municipal government of Toronto
 List of Toronto municipal elections

References

External links 

 Councillor's webpage

Etobicoke
Toronto city council wards
2018 establishments in Ontario